There are at least 6 named lakes and reservoirs in Daniels County, Montana.

Lakes
 Paradis Pond, el.

Reservoirs
 Silver Lake, el. 
 Killenbeck Lake, el. 
 Killenbeck Reservoir, el. 
 Whitetail Reservoir, el. 
 Whitetail Storage Reservoir, el.

See also
 List of lakes in Montana

Notes

Bodies of water of Daniels County, Montana
Daniels